Georges Guillez (3 September 1909 – 15 April 1993) was a French sprinter. He competed in the men's 4 × 400 metres relay at the 1936 Summer Olympics.

References

1909 births
1993 deaths
Athletes (track and field) at the 1936 Summer Olympics
French male sprinters
Olympic athletes of France
Place of birth missing